Leveromyia is a genus of flies in the family Stratiomyidae.

Species
Leveromyia geniculata Lindner, 1937
Leveromyia lindneri James, 1978

References

Stratiomyidae
Brachycera genera
Taxa named by Erwin Lindner
Diptera of Australasia